Alfred Braithwood (February 15, 1892 – November 24, 1960) was a professional baseball pitcher.

External links

1892 births
1960 deaths
People from Will County, Illinois
Pittsburgh Rebels players
Major League Baseball pitchers
Baseball players from Illinois
Bradford Drillers players